Dave Mirra Freestyle BMX is a sports video game series that was originally developed by Z-Axis and published by Acclaim Max Sports. Neon Studios originally developed the handheld port before Full Fat took over developing the handheld ports. After Acclaim went bankrupt in 2004, Left Field Productions developed a final entry in the series, 2006's Dave Mirra BMX Challenge.

Games

Dave Mirra Freestyle BMX (2000)

Information needed

Dave Mirra Freestyle BMX: Maximum Remix (2001)

Information needed

Dave Mirra Freestyle BMX 2 (2001)

Information needed

BMX XXX (2002)

Information needed

Dave Mirra BMX Challenge (2006)

Information needed

References

External links
 

 
Video game franchises
Video game franchises introduced in 2000